Bawskee 3.5 (stylized in all-caps) is the third mixtape by American rapper Comethazine, released on July 26, 2019 by Alamo Records and Interscope Records. It serves as the third installment in the Bawskee mixtape series.

Singles
The mixtape's lead single "Just Saying" was released on June 21, 2019.

The second single "Stand" was released on July 19, only eight days before the release of the mixtape.

Critical reception

Bawskee 3.5 mostly mixed reviews. Neil Z. Yeung of AllMusic wrote, "While not much has changed -- both in regards to lyrical content and production quality -- listeners in need of another dose of the Bawskee will be pleased with this fresh dozen."

Riley Wallace of HipHopDX gave the mixtape a 3/5 rating saying, "While his ultra-violent, gruff, murder raps remain almost painfully consistent, he still manages to experiment with his style and beat selection playfully."

Commercial performance
Bawskee 3.5 debuted at number 53 on the US Billboard 200 chart.

Track listing
Credits adapted from Genius.

Notes
 All track titles are stylized in all caps.

Charts

References

2019 mixtape albums
Comethazine albums